Israel participated in the Junior Eurovision Song Contest 2018 which took place on 25 November 2018, in Minsk, Belarus. The Israeli broadcaster Israeli Public Broadcasting Corporation (KAN) was responsible for organising their entry for the contest. This is Israel's third appearance at the Junior Eurovision Song Contest.

Background

They briefly returned in 2016 with Shir & Tim singing "Follow My Heart" before withdrawing again in 2017.

The EBU published the final list of participating countries on 2 August 2018, in which Israel appeared within the participating list for the contest which takes place on 25 November 2018, in Minsk, Belarus.

Before Junior Eurovision

Kdam Eurovision Junior 2018 
The singer who performed the Israeli entry for the Junior Eurovision Song Contest 2018 was selected through the singing competition Kdam Eurovision Junior 2018 ("Pre Junior Eurovision 2018"). The Israeli broadcaster opened a call for performers for their 2018 Junior Eurovision national selection in August 2018. The candidates took part in live auditions where an expert committee selected the 6 participants that participated at the national final, where they performed cover songs. A three-person jury panel made-up of former Eurovision representatives Yardena Arazi (1976 and 1988), Lior Narkis (2003), and singer Hanan Ben Ari decided the results of the competition.

The show took place on 6 September 2018 at the Russel Theatre in Ramat Gan, hosted by Yaron Rubinsky and Roni Dalumi, and was broadcast on 2 October 2018 on Kan 11. After all of the covers were performed by the competing artists, the contestants sang the four Israeli winning songs of the Eurovision Song Contest: A-Ba-Ni-Bi (1978), Hallelujah (1979), Diva (1998) and Toy (2018).

Song selection 
After Dadon's win, KAN launched an open call for the song, which a jury internally selected the song "Children Like These (Yelaad’im Kaeele)" for him. The song was written and composed by Eden Hason.

Artist and song information

Noam Dadon (born 20 June 2005) is an Israeli singer. He represented Israel at the Junior Eurovision Song Contest 2018. His song for the contest, "Children Like These" was released 8 October 2018.

At Junior Eurovision
During the opening ceremony and the running order draw which both took place on 19 November 2018, Israel was drawn to perform fourteenth on 25 November 2018, following Georgia and preceding France.

Voting

Detailed voting results

References

Junior Eurovision Song Contest
Israel
Junior 2018